Ingra de Souza Liberato (born September 21, 1966) is a Brazilian actress. From 2016 she began to sing as Ingra Lyberato.

Career 
Ingra de Souza Liberato was born in Salvador, Bahia, the daughter of filmmakers. She had her debut in cinema at the age of 7, playing the role of a mermaid in the short film Ementário (1973), directed by her father Chico Liberato and scripted by her mother Alba Liberato.

She worked in telenovelas and was highly successful in the former Rede Manchete, as Pantanal, and A História de Ana Raio e Zé Trovão, then moved to Rede Globo.

In 2002, she moved to Porto Alegre. She was married for five years to director Jayme Monjardim and for eleven years to musician Duca Leindecker, of the band Cidadão Quem and Pouca Vogal, with whom she has a son, Guilherme (2003).

In 2007, she received the Kikito award in the category best actress for her performance in the film Valsa para Bruno Stein Festival de Gramado.

In 2016, she began to create and script documentary series and write her first book, O Medo do Sucesso, edited by L&PM, where she relates the successes and mistakes of her artistic career.

Filmography

Television

Film

References

External links 

1966 births
Living people
People from Salvador, Bahia
Brazilian television actresses
Brazilian telenovela actresses
Brazilian film actresses
Brazilian stage actresses